Vanila M. Singh is an American physician and professor with involvement in United States health policy. Singh was a candidate for the United States House of Representatives in 2014. Early in her career she taught at UCLA Medical Center, and she is currently an associate professor of anesthesiology, perioperative and pain medicine at Stanford University Medical Center. On June 12, 2017, she was appointed the chief medical officer to the Office of the Assistant Secretary for Health at the U.S. Department of Health and Human Services, a presidential appointment at the Senior Executive Service level. She served as Chair of the Inter-Agency Pain Management Task Force established by the CARA Act of 2016, which released its final report on acute and chronic pain management best practices on May 30, 2019. Dr. Singh was also appointed as the Acting Regional Health Administrator in Region 9 (California, Arizona, Nevada, Hawaii and six Pacific Islands) in August 2018.

With various Republican Party endorsements, in early 2014 Singh announced a campaign against incumbent Mike Honda to represent California's 17th congressional district (Silicon Valley) in the US House of Representatives. In the primaries Singh came in third In August 2014, Neel Kashkari named Singh the chairperson of the Indo American Coalition during his campaign for the governorship of California. In 2016, she was a California delegate at the Republican National Convention in Cleveland.

Singh is vice chairman of the National Physicians Council on Health Policy. In 2016 she was named to the editorial board of Interventional Pain Letters. For 2016 and 2017, she was named chair of the professional standards/conduct committee of the Santa Clara County Medical Association.

Early life and education
Vanila M. Singh was born in Bikaner, India. At age one her parents Lalit and Leela Mathur immigrated to the United States. The family moved to California when she was four years old, and she spent her youth in Fremont, California, attending Niles Elementary School, Centerville Junior High School, and Washington High School. During her childhood her parents helped establish the Hindu Temple in Fremont, also founding the Rajasthani Association of North America.

Singh was accepted to the University of California, Berkeley where she double-majored in economics and molecular and cell biology. Graduating with a B.S., she then moved to Washington, D.C. to become a medical student at the George Washington University Medical Center, where she received her M.D.

Career

Medical roles
Singh completed her initial medical internship at Yale University Medical Center in 1997 and 1998. An anesthesia resident at Cornell Medical Center in Manhattan from 1998 until 2001, from 2001 until 2002 she was a pain management fellow in various locations, including Cornell University, Columbia Medical Center, Memorial Sloan Kettering Cancer Center, and the Hospital for Special Surgery. She is double-certified in anesthesia and pain management from the American Board of Anesthesiology. After serving as a clinical assistant professor at the University of California, Los Angeles (UCLA) Medical Center, she became a clinical associate professor at Stanford University Medical School for anesthesiology, perioperative and pain medicine. 
Specializing in ultrasound-guided interventional procedures for pain and regional anesthesiology, Singh earned a Masters of Academic Medicine from University of Southern California. Dr. Singh is named as a teaching mentor for the pain fellowship at Walter Reed National Military Medical Center.

U.S. Department of Health and Human Services 
Dr. Singh was named Chief Medical Officer for the Office of the Assistant Secretary for Health at the U.S. Department of Health and Human Services (HHS) on June 12, 2017, as the primary medical advisor to the Assistant Secretary for Health on the development and implementation of HHS-wide public health policy recommendations, and guiding the national policy on opioids. Dr. Singh chaired the congressionally mandated Pain Management Best Practices Inter-Agency Task Force and launched the National Pain Strategy, the government's first broad-ranging effort to improve how pain is perceived, assessed and treated, and what the effects of the opioid epidemic was on various communities. The task force published its report on May 30, 2019, which was endorsed by organizations including the American Medical Association.

She was also appointed as the Acting Regional Health Administrator for Region 9 (California, Arizona, Nevada, Hawaii and six Pacific Islands) in August 2018.

Board memberships 
Dr. Singh is an independent member of the board of Lucid Lane, a telehealth service for preventing anxiety, pain, and dependence on substances and medication. She was appointed as an independent board of directors member for BioDelivery Sciences, International (NASDAQ: BDSI), a specialty pharmaceutical company focused on the treatment of serious and debilitating chronic conditions. Dr. Singh is also an independent board member for Virpax Pharmaceuticals Inc., a company developing novel drug delivery systems for pain management.

Media coverage 
Dr. Singh is a frequent contributor on local and national TV covering the COVID-19 pandemic. She has appeared on Fox Business' Neil Cavuto: Coast to Coast, Newsy Tonight with Chance Seales, and FOX KTVU. She has penned several op-eds on COVID-19, pain management policies, mental health, and illicit drugs which have been published in The Hill, Washington Post, STAT, and American Military News. Dr. Singh has also been profiled in Silicon Valley Magazine and Practical Pain Management.

2014 election
In January 2014 she challenged incumbent Mike Honda, a Democrat, to represent  (Silicon Valley) in the 2014 midterm elections. She was the first Republican-endorsed candidate to enter the race leading up to the June 3, 2014 open primaries held to select the two main candidates for the official elections in November. Although new to politics, Singh had previously supported politicians such as Democratic Representative Tulsi Gabbard of Hawaii. An early poll in March 2014 indicated Singh ahead of Democratic challenger Ro Khanna and behind Honda. As campaign points she focused on topics such as healthcare reform. She criticized the Affordable Care Act as lacking of physician involvement in the drafting of the legislation, arguing it needed to be overhauled or shut down. She received the endorsement of the Santa Clara and Alameda Republican Party, as well as House Republicans including congressmen Pete Sessions and Eric Cantor, and she was named "one to watch" by the National Republican Congressional Campaign Committee.

Voters began casting ballots by mail on May 3 and on June 4 Honda and Ro Khanna were the top finishers in the election, followed by Singh with 16 percent of the vote.

Later political roles
In August 2014, Republican gubernatorial candidate Neel Kashkari named Singh the chair of his "Indo American Coalition team" while campaigning against incumbent Jerry Brown. In July 2016, the press reported that Singh was serving as a California delegate at the Republican National Convention. In September, the Economic Times also reported that she was "actively working with national lawmakers on health policy issues." Singh has since published several chapters and government papers on the opioid crisis.

Personal life
A resident of the Bay Area of California, Singh is married with two children.

Awards and Achievements

On October 16, 2021, Dr. Singh was awarded the Standiford Helm Award honoring individuals advancing the specialty of Interventional Pain Management. On February 28, 2020, she was awarded the Philipp M. Lippe award from the American Academy of Pain Medicine for outstanding contributions to the social and political aspects of pain medicine. In 2018, Singh was awarded the Lifetime Achievement Award by the American Society of Interventional Pain Physicians.

See also
United States House of Representatives elections in California, 2014

References

External links
drvanilasingh.com
Vanila Singh at Stanford University

People from Fremont, California
Living people
People from Bikaner
Stanford University faculty
California Republicans
Indian emigrants to the United States
American pain physicians
Year of birth missing (living people)